Timothy is a masculine name. It is a version of the Greek name  (Timόtheos) meaning "one who honours God", from τιμή "honour" and θεός "god". Timothy (and its variations) is a common name in several countries.

In the United States, the name was most popular in the 1960s, ranking 13th among all boys' names. Popularity for the name has since declined, with its latest rating of 110th in 2009. The name has been used for girls, having a peak in 1968, ranking 908 in the United States, and has declined since, making it a very rare name for girls.

People named Timothy

Religion
 Timothy of Ammon (2nd century BC), Ammonite general
 Saint Timothy, 1st-century Christian bishop whose name is associated with two books of the New Testament
 Timothy (d. 178), companion of Symphorian, Christian martyr
 Timothy of Constantinople (7th century), Christian priest and writer
 Timothy, Bishop of Zagreb (d. 1287)
 Timothy of Faras (fl. 1372), Nubian bishop
 Timothy Drew (Prophet Noble Drew Ali), founder of the Moorish Science Temple of America
 Timothy Kwok, Hong Kong-born Anglican bishop

Patriarchs of Constantinople
 Timothy I of Constantinople (d. 523)
 Timothy II of Constantinople (d. 1620)

Patriarchs of Alexandria
 Timothy I of Alexandria, 4th-century bishop
 Timothy II of Alexandria, also known as Timotheus Aelurus, 5th-century monophysite bishop
 Timothy Salophakiolos, known as Timothy III, the Greek Orthodox patriarch of Alexandria from 460475 and again from 477 until his death in 485
 Timothy IV of Alexandria, a bishop in the 6th century. Also known as Timothy III, since the Coptic Church does not recognize the third Timothy

Patriarchs of Seleucia-Ctesiphon
 Timothy I of Seleucia-Ctesiphon, patriarch of the Church of the East, 780–823
 Timothy II of Seleucia-Ctesiphon, patriarch of the Church of the East, 1318–c.1332

Sports
Timothy Cheruiyot, Kenyan middle-distance runner specialising in the 1500 metres
Timothy Disken, Australian paralympic swimmer
Timothy Fok, President of the Hong Kong Football Association
Timothy Goebel, American figure skater
Timothy Henry Henman, British professional tennis player
Timothy Hodge, Australian Paralympic swimmer
Timothy LeDuc, American pair skater
Timothy Liljegren (born 1999), Swedish ice hockey defenceman
Timothy Lowndes, Australian sport shooter
Timothy Maloney, Australian wheelchair basketball player
Timothy Masters (rower), Australian rower
Timothy McIsaac, Canadian Paralympic swimmer
Timothy McKernan, American figure skater
Timothy Peters, NASCAR driver
Timothy Phillips, known as Tim Phillips, American competition swimmer
Timothy Seaman, American race walker
Timothy Soares (born 1997), American-Brazilian basketball player for Ironi Ness Ziona of the Israeli Basketball Premier League

Arts
Timothy Adams, American actor and model
Timothy Bottoms, American actor
Timothy Busfield, American actor
Timothy Carlton, English actor
Timothy Dalton, Welsh-born English actor
Timothy Fadek, American photographer
Timothy Granaderos (born 1986), American actor and model
Timothy Hutton, American actor
Timothy Leary, American writer, psychologist, and psychedelic drug advocate
Timothy Z. Mosley (Timbaland), record producer and rapper
Timothy Patrick Murphy, American actor
Timothy V. Murphy, Irish actor
Timothy Olyphant, American actor
Timothy Omundson, American actor
Timothy J. Rice-Oxley, songwriter and keyboard player in British band Keane
Timothy B. Schmit American musician
Timothy Smith, Australian DJ and electronic music producer known as Timmy Trumpet
Timothy Spall, English actor
Timothy Tau, Taiwanese American actor
Timothy Van Laar, American artist, writer, and professor
Timothy James Webb, Australian artist
Timothy Wilcots, American drag performer also known as Latrice Royale

Politics
Timothy Groseclose, American political scientist and economist.
Timothy Pickering, politician from Massachusetts who served as the third United States Secretary of State
Timothy Pilgrim, Australian Privacy Commissioner and Australian Information Commissioner
Timothy Quill, Irish politician

Other
Timothy J. Broderick, American physician and university professor
Timothy Ray Brown, the Berlin Patient, the first person in the world to be cured of HIV
Timothy Creamer, American astronaut
Timothy J. Cunningham (1982–2018), formerly missing person
Timothy Egan, American journalist
Timothy Ha, former Supervisor and Principal of St. Paul's College, Hong Kong and Education Secretary of the Hong Kong Sheng Kung Hui 
Timothy Kopra, American astronaut
Timothy McVeigh, the terrorist convicted of the Oklahoma City bombing
Timothy Mo, British Asian novelist
Tiff Needell, also known as Timothy Tiff Needell, a UK television presente
Timothy Peake, British test pilot and astronaut
Timothy Snyder, American author and historian
Timothy Tong, former commissioner for the Independent Commission Against Corruption of Hong Kong
Timothy Treadwell, grizzly bear enthusiast
Timothy Wong Man-kong, historian from Hong Kong

Fictional characters
Timothy Claypole, a character from Rentaghost
Reverend Timothy Lovejoy, a character from The Simpsons.
Timothy McGee, a character from NCIS
Timothy Q. Mouse, a character from the 1941 Disney film Dumbo.
Timothy Twostroke, a character in the Pixar film Cars
Timothy Wright, a character in the alternate reality game Marble Hornets
Timothy "Tiny Tim" Cratchit, a character from the 1843 novella A Christmas Carol by Charles Dickens
Timothy Pilgrim, the titular character from the 1975 TVOntario series The Adventures of Timothy Pilgrim

Surname
 Christopher Timothy (born 1940), Welsh actor.
 Miriam Timothy (1879–1950), British harpist.
 Nick Timothy (born 1980), British political adviser.

Disambiguations
 Tim (disambiguation)
 Timoti (disambiguation)
 Timothy Brown (disambiguation), multiple people

References

See also
 Tim
 Timmy
 Timo
 Timotheus
 Timothée

Given names of Greek language origin
Masculine given names
English given names
English masculine given names